The Bioinformatic Harvester was a bioinformatic meta search engine created by the European Molecular Biology Laboratory and subsequently hosted and further developed by KIT Karlsruhe Institute of Technology for genes and protein-associated information. Harvester currently works for human, mouse, rat, zebrafish, drosophila and arabidopsis thaliana based information. Harvester cross-links >50 popular bioinformatic resources and allows cross searches. Harvester serves tens of thousands of pages every day to scientists and physicians. Since 2014 the service is down.

How Harvester works 

Harvester collects information from protein and gene databases along with information from so called "prediction servers." Prediction server e.g. provide online sequence analysis for a single protein. Harvesters search index is based on the IPI and UniProt protein information collection. The collections consists of:

 ~72.000 human, ~57.000 mouse, ~41.000 rat, ~51.000 zebrafish, ~35.000 arabidopsis protein pages, which cross-link ~50 major bioinformatic resources.

Harvester crosslinks several types of information

Text based information
From the following databases:

 UniProt, one of the largest protein databases
 SOURCE, convenient gene information overview
 Simple Modular Architecture Research Tool (SMART)
 SOSUI, predicts transmembrane domains
 PSORT, predicts protein localisation
 HomoloGene, compares proteins from different species
 gfp-cdna, protein localisation with fluorescence microscopy
 International Protein Index (IPI)

Databases rich in graphical elements 
These databases are not collected, but are crosslinked, being displayed via iframes. An iframe is a window within an HTML page for an embedded view of and interactive access to the linked database. Several such iframes are combined on a single Harvester protein page. This allows simultaneous convenient comparison of information from several databases.

 NCBI-BLAST, an algorithm for comparing biological sequences from the NCBI
 Ensembl, automatic gene annotation by the EMBL-EBI and Sanger Institute
 FlyBase is a database of model organism Drosophila melanogaster
 GoPubMed is a knowledge-based search engine for biomedical texts
 iHOP, information hyperlinked over proteins via gene/protein synonyms
 Mendelian Inheritance in Man project catalogues all the known diseases
 RZPD, German resources Center for genome research in Berlin/Heidelberg
 STRING, Search Tool for the Retrieval of Interacting Genes/Proteins, developed by EMBL, SIB and UZH
 Zebrafish Information Network
 LOCATE subcellular localization database (mouse)

Access from external application 

 Genome browser, working draft assemblies for genomes UCSC
 Google Scholar
 Mitocheck
 PolyMeta, meta search engine for Google, Yahoo, MSN, Ask, Exalead, AllTheWeb, GigaBlast

What one can find 

Harvester allows a combination of different search terms and single words.

Search Examples:

 Gene-name: "golga3"
 Gene-alias: "ADAP-S ADAS ADHAPS ADPS" (one gene name is sufficient)
 Gene-Ontologies: "Enzyme linked receptor protein signaling pathway"
 Unigene-Cluster: "Hs.449360"
 Go-annotation: "intra-Golgi transport"
 Molecular function: "protein kinase binding"
 Protein: "Q9NPD3"
 Protein domain: "SH2 sar"
 Protein Localisation: "endoplasmic reticulum"
 Chromosome: "2q31"
 Disease relevant: use the word "diseaselink"
 Combinations: "golgi diseaselink" (finds all golgi proteins associated with a disease)
 mRNA: "AL136897"
 Word: "Cancer"
 Comment: "highly expressed in heart"
 Author: "Merkel, Schmidt"
 Publication or project: "cDNA sequencing project"

See also
 List of academic databases and search engines
 Biological databases
 Entrez
 European Bioinformatics Institute
 Human Protein Reference Database
 Metadata
 Sequence profiling tool

Literature

Notes and references

External links 
   Bioinformatic Harvester V at KIT Karlsruhe Institute of Technology
 

Bioinformatics software
Biological databases
Biology websites
Internet search engines
Science and technology in Cambridgeshire
South Cambridgeshire District